The following are the magazines of Ramakrishna Mission. The magazines of Ramakrishna Mission focus on spirituality, vedanta, religious studies, and service activities.

References

External links
Official Website of The Headquarters of Ramakrishna Math and Ramakrishna Mission (Belur Math)
About Ramakrishna Math and Ramakrishna Mission

Ramakrishna Mission
Hindu magazines
Ramakrishna Mission
Magazines about spirituality